The Puducherry district, also known by its former name Pondicherry district, is one of the four districts of the union territory of Puducherry in South India. According to the 2011 census, the district has a population of 950,289.

Administrative divisions

For administrative purpose, the union territory of Puducherry is divided into eight taluks. Four of these, viz. Puducherry, Uzhavarkarai, Villianur and Bahour, together constitute Puducherry district. Among these four, only Ozhukarai taluk does not contain any rural area. The rural areas under the other three taluks are further divided commune panchayats (CP) or simply communes. Rural area of Puducherry taluk is covered by a single communeAriyankuppam, whereas Villianur taluk has two communes, viz. Villianur and Mannadipet, and rural area of Bahour taluk consists of two communes, viz. Bahour and Nettapakkam.

Census 2011 has identified three census towns in Puducherry district, along with three existing statutory towns. Pondicherry and Ozhukarai are the municipalities, Kurumbapet is the gram panchayat and the 3 census towns are: Ariyankuppam, Manavely and Villianur. Puducherry urban agglomeration consists of the area under the all these six towns along with Odiampet, which is considered as urban outgrowth of Kurumbapet.

For the ease of administration, Department of Revenue and Disaster Management, Government of Puducherry, has defined two sub-divisions of the Puducherry district, viz. Pondicherry North subdivision and Pondicherry South subdivision, each consisting of two taluks. Pondicherry North subdivision contains the taluks of Pondicherry and Ozhukarai, whereas Pondicherry South subdivision consists of the other two taluks of the district, viz. Villianur and Bahour. Each of these four taluks are further divided into sub-taluks/firkas which consists of revenue villages from rural/semi-urban/urban area.
 
Planning and Research Department, Government of Puducherry, further defines the notion of a block. The union territory of Puducherry is divided into six blocks, three of which forms the Puducherry district, viz. Ariyankuppam, Ozkhukarai and Villianur.

Demographics
Puducherry's population, 950,289, is roughly equal to that of the nation of Fiji or the US state of Delaware. This gives it a ranking of 460th in India (out of a total of 640). 
Its population growth rate over the decade 2001-2011 was 28.73%. Puducherry has a sex ratio of 1,031 females for every 1,000 males, and a literacy rate of 86.13%.

Notes

External links 
 North East Monsoon 2009 - Action Plan published by Department of Revenue and Disaster Management, Government of Puducherry
 Right to Information Act Manual published by Department of Revenue and Disaster Management, Government of Puducherry
 Draft Annual Plan 2012-13, published by Planning and Research Department, Government of Puducherry

 
Districts of Puducherry